Rawalpindi Medical University is a public university located in Rawalpindi, Punjab, Pakistan. It is affiliated with three public sector teaching hospitals (Holy Family Hospital, Benazir Bhutto Hospital & DHQ Hospital- Rawalpindi) for undergraduate and postgraduate medical education & training. It is also listed among the recognised universities and degree awarding institutions by the Higher Education Commission of Pakistan.

Campus: University has two main campuses, Tipu Road campus & Holy Family Hospital campus. Basic sciences classes are taught at Tipu Road campus and clinical sciences are taught at Holy Family Hospital campus.

Societies: There are various societies at the university, notably among them are; Rawalians Arts society, Rawalians sports society, Medicose Aid society, Rawalians literary society, Rawalians dramatic club, Rawalians student research society, Rawalian Adventure Club, Step Ahead Welfare Society & Islamic society, Recreational Activities Club.

History 

The university was established in 1974 as Rawalpindi Medical College. It was initially affialited with the University of the Punjab, Lahore, Pakistan. In 2003, it became affiliated with the University of Health Sciences, Lahore. In May 2017, this college was upgraded to university status by the Government of Punjab, Pakistan.

Programs 
University offers undergraduate programs of MBBS and BSC Allied Health as well as post graduate residency and fellowship programs at its attached teaching hospitals.

Affiliated teaching hospitals 
Three public sector hospitals are currently affiliated with the university, all of them are located in the city of Rawalpindi. These are Holy Family Hospital, Benazir Bhutto Hospital and District Headquarters (DHQ) Hospital. Benazir Bhutto Hospital was previously known as Rawalpindi General Hospital. It was renamed in the honor of Benazir Bhutto, as she was pronounced dead in this hospital on 27 December 2007.

References

Medical universities in Punjab, Pakistan
Medical colleges in Punjab, Pakistan
Universities and colleges in Rawalpindi District
Educational institutions established in 1974
1974 establishments in Pakistan
Public universities and colleges in Punjab, Pakistan